The following is a list of awards received by writer Cormac McCarthy:

Awards 
 1959, 1960 Ingram-Merrill awards
 1965 Traveling Fellowship from the American Academy of Arts and Letters
 1966 William Faulkner Foundation Award for notable first novel for The Orchard Keeper
 1969 Guggenheim Fellowship for creative writing
 1981 MacArthur Fellowship
 1992 National Book Award for Fiction and the National Book Critics Circle Award for All the Pretty Horses
 1996 International Dublin Literary Award longlist for The Crossing
 2000 International Dublin Literary Award longlist for Cities of the Plain
 2006 James Tait Black Memorial Prize for Fiction and Believer Book Award for The Road
 2007 Pulitzer Prize for Fiction for The Road
 2007 International Dublin Literary Award shortlist for No Country for Old Men
 2008 Maltese Falcon Award, Japan, for No Country for Old Men
 2008 Premio Ignotus for The Road
 2008 International Dublin Literary Award longlist for The Road
 2008 PEN/Saul Bellow Award for Achievement in American Fiction, for a career whose writing "possesses qualities of excellence, ambition, and scale of achievement over a sustained career which place him or her in the highest rank of American literature."
 2012 Best of the James Tait Black, shortlist, The Road

See also
Cormac McCarthy bibliography

References

External links

Cormac McCarthy